Drosophila putrida is a species of fruit fly in the family Drosophilidae. It is found throughout the temperate central-eastern United States. Like other members of the Drosophila testacea species group, D. putrida breeds exclusively on mushrooms.

References

Further reading

External links

 Diptera.info

putrida
Insects described in 1916